The GE AN/GPA-73 Radar Course Directing Group (mobile version AN/CPA-73) was a US Cold War air defense command, control, and coordination system developed for the Electronic Systems Division 412L Air Weapons Control System (colloq. "AWCS 412L") for weapons direction (ground-controlled interception, GCI, by "Fire Direction and Control Equipment").  The AN/GPA-73 was used to create a "Base Air Defense Ground Environment" (BADGE II), for which Air Defense Command had recommended the system as "SAGE back-up (Mode Ill) control of BOMARC" in June 1958.  When the GPA-73 was emplaced with the AN/FSA-21 Weapons Control Group computer for GCI, the system created a "miniature SAGE" military installation.  The GPA-73 could also direct Project Nike surface-to-air missile fire from Nike Integrated Fire Control sites equipped with the "412 Target Designation System" in the Battery Control Van in a space allocated by February 1957 "behind the ". and the AN/GPA-73.

The 412L Joint Test Force was located at Myrtle Beach Air Force Base in 1963, testing revealed fragility that limited the unit to fixed emplacements, and "Tactical Air Command subsequently rejected the GPA-73 as part of its mobility forces."  The 412L equipment supported "Det 1, 17th Air Force [in] the Allied Sector Operations Center III at Börfink", Germany, which had a nuclear bunker where on July 2, 1975, the 615th Aircraft Control and Warning Squadron temporarily stopped 412L operations [for] Constant Keystone modification."  Sites with the AN/GPA-73 planned for the Alaska Semi-Automatic Defense System (ALSADS) were cancelled on January 26, 1960, and the last "operational 412L equipment" was used by USAFE in Germany.

Description
The GPA-73 included the following equipment (quantity in parenthesis):
AN/GKA-10 & AN/GKA-11 Converter Groups (RCA)
AN/GKA-13 Monitor Transmitter Group (RCA)
AN/GKA-12 Receiver Group (General Electric Company — Defense Systems Department)
Data Processing and Display Subsystem
AN/FSA-12 Detector-Tracker Group, Radar
OA-3253	Track Data Processor
OA-3254	Tracker Auxiliary Unit
OA-3255	Digital Tracker
OA-3263	Radar Detector
OA-1723	Surveillance-Identification Group
OA-3102	Surveillance Console
OA-3103	Identification Console
OA-3217	Radar Data Processor
OA-3219	Surveillance-ID Data Converter
OA-1724	Site-to-Site Data Link Group
OA-3104	Data Link Central
OA-3252	Battery Data Link
OA-3327	Message Processor
OA-3329	Coordinate Converter
OA-1718	Height Data Group
OA-3208	Height Data Display Converter
OA-3209	Height Data Programmer
OA-3403	Height Data Console [from "MPS-14 radar"]
OA-3403	Height Data Console [from "MPS-16 radar"]
OA-3216	Status Display Group
OA-3233	Situation Projection Group
AN/FSA-21	Weapons Control Group
OA-3161	Data Storage Unit
OA-3162	Digital Computer
OA-3179 (3)	Weapons Display Converter
OA-3183 (4)	Weapons Control Console
OA-3180	Computer Auxiliary Unit
OA-3210	Ground-to-Air Coupler
OA-3264 (2)	Core Memory
OA-3436	Tape Transport Unit
AN/FSA-23	Jammer Tracker Group
OA-3223	Azimuth Tracker
OA-3224 (2)	Jammer Tracker Console
OA-3227	Jammer Tracker Display Converter
OA-3232	Performance Monitor Group
OA-3237	Performance Monitor Console
OA-3393	Confidence Indicator Console
OA-3422	Performance Monitor Display Converter
ID-936	Site Equipment Status Display
(Portable)	Trouble Analyzer
Prime Power Group
Power Supply Sets
OA-3169 (4) Data Processing Power Supply
Communication Subsystem	
OA-3261	Crosstell Input Group
Electronic Switching Center	
Flight Control Package
Subscriber Sets
AN/TRC-24
R-278
R-361
T-217
BC-639
AN/FGC-25
AN/FGC-20
Ancillary Subsystem	
Temperature Control Group		
Data Acquisition Subsystem
AN/FSA-31	Radar Signal Processor
OA-3247	Comparator
OA-3250	Integrator

References

Aerial warfare ground equipment
Cold War military computer systems of the United States
Cold War military equipment of the United States Air Force
General Electric systems
Military equipment introduced in the 1950s